Agnes Meyer-Brandis (born 1973) is a German installation artist, known for her Moon Goose Colony, an internationally exhibited artwork and film in which (inspired by a story by Francis Godwin) she raises a flock of geese and teaches them to become astronauts.

After briefly studying mineralogy at the RWTH Aachen University, Meyer-Brandis studied sculpture at the Maastricht Academy of Fine Arts in the Netherlands, studied with Czech photographer and conceptual artist Magdalena Jetelová at the Kunstakademie Düsseldorf in Düsseldorf, Germany, and then earned a master's degree in audio visual media from the Academy of Media Arts Cologne in Cologne, Germany.

Meyer-Brandis' other artworks include her Iceberg Probe, which won first prize at transmediale 2006, a 2008 installation investigating from an artistic point of view the effects of a total solar eclipse on a zoo in Novosibirsk, and a project in association with the city of Yekaterinburg at the third Moscow Biennale in 2009. In 2014 Meyer-Brandis takes part at exhibition 'The Invisible Force Behind.' at Imai – inter media art institute within Quadriennale Düsseldorf.

References

1973 births
Living people
German women artists
German installation artists